Rawon is an Indonesian beef soup. Originating from East Java, rawon utilizes the black keluak nut as the main seasoning, which gives a dark color and nutty flavor to the soup.

Ingredients 

The soup is composed of a ground mixture of garlic, shallots, keluak, ginger, candlenut, turmeric, red chili, and salt, and is sautéed with oil. The sautéed mixture is then poured into boiled beef stock with diced beef slices.

Lemongrass, galangal, bay leaves, kaffir lime leaves, and sugar are then added as seasonings. The special dark or black color of rawon comes from the keluak as the main spice. The soup is usually garnished with green onion and fried shallot, and served with rice. Other toppings include bean sprouts, salted preserved egg, krupuk, and fried tolo beans (black-eyed pea).

History 
Rawon is one of the oldest historically identified dishes of ancient Java. It was mentioned as rarawwan in an ancient Javanese Taji inscription (901 CE) from the era of the Mataram Kingdom.

Variants 
There are several variants of rawon, with the most popular being rawon from Surabaya. A version called rawon setan ("devil's rawon") is sold as a late-night meal at Indonesian food stalls open from midnight to dawn, supposedly the hours during which devils roam.

In Balinese cuisine, rawon does not use any keluak—thus, the color is brown instead of black. Additionally, as the Balinese are mostly Hindu, they tend to favor pork over beef.

See also

 List of Indonesian soups

References

Indonesian soups
Javanese cuisine